Bierbrauer is a German occupational surname literally meaning "beer brewer". Notable people with the surname include:

Adolf Bierbrauer
Günther Bierbrauer
Volker Bierbrauer
Werner-Joachim Bierbrauer, birth name of Joachim Siegerist

See also
Birbraer, Yiddish variant

German-language surnames
Occupational surnames